Plesiopelma is a genus of South American tarantulas that was first described by Reginald Innes Pocock in 1901.
Plesiopelma species are particularly abundant along mountainous ranges, frequently living under stones. Both males and females live in silk tubes under stones with aggregate spatial distribution. The walls of these tunnels are covered by waterproof silk, protecting them from floods. In addition, there is a uniform saturated microclimate inside the tunnel, which protects the spiders from dehydration.

Species
 it contains eleven species, found in Paraguay, Uruguay, Brazil, Venezuela, and Argentina:
Plesiopelma aspidosperma Ferretti & Barneche, 2013 – Argentina
Plesiopelma gertschi (Caporiacco, 1955) – Venezuela
Plesiopelma imperatrix Piza, 1976 – Brazil
Plesiopelma insulare (Mello-Leitão, 1923) – Brazil
Plesiopelma longisternale (Schiapelli & Gerschman, 1942) – Argentina, Uruguay
Plesiopelma minense (Mello-Leitão, 1943) – Brazil
Plesiopelma myodes Pocock, 1901 (type) – Uruguay
Plesiopelma paganoi Ferretti & Barneche, 2013 – Argentina
Plesiopelma physopus (Mello-Leitão, 1926) – Brazil
Plesiopelma rectimanum (Mello-Leitão, 1923) – Brazil
Plesiopelma semiaurantiacum (Simon, 1897) – Paraguay, Uruguay

Formerly included:
P. flavohirtum (Simon, 1889) (Transferred to Catanduba)

See also
 List of Theraphosidae species

References

Theraphosidae genera
Spiders of South America
Taxa named by R. I. Pocock
Theraphosidae